YSPI may refer to:
 Springsure Airport
 Acyl-homoserine-lactone synthase, an enzyme